Buttigieg is a Maltese surname, derived from Sicilian Arabic  Abu-d-dajāj(i), meaning 'chicken owner, poulterer' (literally 'father of chickens'). People with the name include:

 Anthony Buttigieg (born 1962), Maltese politician
 Anton Buttigieg (1912–1983), Maltese politician and poet, president of Malta 1976–1981
 Chasten Buttigieg (born 1989), American author, educator, activist
 Claudette Buttigieg (born 1968), Maltese politician
 John Buttigieg (born 1963), Maltese footballer
 John Buttigieg (born 1977), Australian rugby league footballer
 Joseph Buttigieg (1947–2019), Maltese-American literary scholar, professor and translator
 Mark Buttigieg (born 1966), Australian politician, member of the New South Wales Legislative Council
 Michael Franciscus Buttigieg (1793–1866), Maltese priest, Bishop of Gozo
 Pete Buttigieg (born 1982), American politician, former mayor of South Bend, Indiana (2012–2020), 2020 US presidential candidate, 19th US Secretary of Transportation
 Ray Buttigieg (born 1955), Maltese poet and musician
 Rebecca Buttigieg, Maltese politician
 Robbie Buttigieg (1936–2004), Maltese footballer
 Simone Buttigieg (born 1994), Maltese footballer

References 

Maltese-language surnames
Occupational surnames